Only for Dolphins is the fifth studio album by American rapper Action Bronson. It was released on September 25, 2020, through Loma Vista Recordings and Concord Records. Production was handled by multiple producers, including Bronson himself, The Alchemist, DJ Muggs, Harry Fraud and Daringer. The cover and interior art were hand-painted by Bronson. The album's title is a reference to a lyric from the song "Mt. Etna" from his previous album, White Bronco, where Bronson raps, "my next album's only for dolphins".

Release and promotion
The lead single of the album, "Latin Grammys", was released on July 30, 2020, alongside a music video that features Action Bronson's face superimposed over bodybuilder Magnús Ver Magnússon's in various scenes of the 1995 World's Strongest Man competition. Various media outlets also compared the video's imagery to Bronson's publicized weight loss at the time. "Golden Eye" was released on September 9, with a music video for the single releasing later alongside the album. The third and final single, "Mongolia" was released on September 16.

The album's release coincided with an array of merchandise and collaborations. On the day of the album's release, Bronson's online store offered stuffed dolphins and beach towels alongside physical copies of the album. Morgenstern's Finest Ice Cream (who Bronson had previously collaborated with for his series Fuck, That's Delicious) released several Only For Dolphins themed frozen desserts in promotion of the album. On October 13, olive oil marketplace Grove and Vine released an Only For Dolphins themed olive oil. Action Bronson has also announced that he was personally bottling and releasing a fragrance named "Splash", based on the album's track of the same name.

Track listing 
Credits adapted from liner notes and Tidal.

Chart

References 

2020 albums
Action Bronson albums
Albums produced by the Alchemist (musician)
Albums produced by Harry Fraud
Albums produced by DJ Muggs
Albums produced by Daringer (producer)
Loma Vista Recordings albums
Concord Records albums